The Cobbold Commission, was a Commission of Enquiry set up to determine whether the people of North Borneo (now Sabah) and Sarawak supported the proposal to create the Federation of Malaysia consisting of Malaya, Brunei, Singapore, North Borneo, and Sarawak. It was also responsible for the subsequent drafting of the Constitution of Malaysia prior to the formation of Malaysia on 16 September 1963. The Commission was headed by former Bank of England governor, Lord Cobbold.

Members 

Members of the Commission were:
 Lord Cobbold, former Governor of the Bank of England, chairman of the Commission
 Wong Pow Nee, Chief Minister of Penang,
 Ghazali Shafie, Permanent Secretary to the Ministry of Foreign Affairs
 Anthony Abell, former Governor of Sarawak
 David Watherston, former Chief Secretary Of Malaya.

Report 
The Commission released its findings, report and recommendations on 1 August 1962. It concluded that the formation of Malaysia should be implemented. However, Lord Cobbold also stressed that all parties enter the federation as equal partners. Lord Cobbold had privately written to British Prime Minister Harold Macmillan on 21 June 1962: "I have supported Malaysia in the report on the assumption that Singapore also joins in ... if Singapore were to drop out, a federation between Malaya and the Borneo territories without Singapore would have few attractions."

Lord Cobbold summarised the Commission's findings as follows:

Table of content 
 
COMPOSITION OF THE COMMISSION 
TERM OF REFERENCE  
INTRODUCTION 
1. ENQUIRY IN SARAWAK
2. ENQUIRY IN NORTH BORNEO
3. ASSESSMENT OF EVIDENCE
4. Recommendations   
A—Recommendations on certain general matters
B—Recommendations by Sir Anthony Abell and Sir David Watherston
C—Recommendations by Dato Wong Pow Nee and Enche Mohammed Ghazali bin Shafie
D—Summary of Recommendations in Sections B and C, and Comments, by the Chairman
5. OTHER MATTERS  
6. THANKS AND ACKNOWLEDGEMENTS
Appendices    
A. Itinerary
B. Census Abstract
C. Cardinal Principles of the rule of the English Rajah
D. Legal Meaning of the Term "Native"
E. North Borneo and Sarawak Governments Papers on Malaysia
F. "Memorandum on Malaysia" Submitted by the Malaysia Solidarity Consultative Committee
Map of the Borneo Territories

See also 

 18-point agreement (Sarawak)
 20-point agreement (Sabah)
 Reid Commission
 Nine Cardinal Principles of the rule of the English Rajah

References

External links 
 Report of the Commission of Enquiry, North Borneo and Sarawak, 1962(full report)
 UN General Assembly 15th Session - The Trusteeship System and Non-Self-Governing Territories (pages:509-510)
 UN General Assembly 18th Session - the Question of Malaysia (pages:41-44)

Malaysian commissions and inquiries
Formation of Malaysia
1962 in Malaya
1962 in North Borneo
1962 in Sarawak
1962 in international relations
History of Malaysia since Independence